William Smythe may refer to:

W. E. Smythe (William Ellsworth Smythe, 1861–1922), journalist, writer and founder of the Little Landers movement
William Smythe (physicist) (1893–1988), American physicist and mentor of six Nobel Prize laureates
William James Smythe (1816–1887), general and colonel-commandant of the Royal Artillery
William Smythe (academic), Oxford college head
Harry Smythe (William Henry Smythe, 1904–1980), pitcher in Major League Baseball
William Smythe of the Smythe baronets
William Smythe (geophysicist) and namesake of Smythe Shoulder

See also
William Smyth (disambiguation)
William Smith (disambiguation)